Guadua weberbaueri (Brazilian Portuguese: taboca) is a species of clumping bamboo found in Bolivia, Brazil, Colombia, Ecuador, French Guiana, Peru and Venezuela.

This bamboo is used for construction, containers, musical instruments and handicrafts.

References

weberbaueri
Trees of Bolivia
Trees of Brazil
Trees of Colombia
Trees of Ecuador
Trees of Venezuela